Heike Dähne (later Möller then Dähne-Kummerow, born 15 October 1961) is a German former swimmer. She competed in the 1980 Summer Olympics and won a bronze medal in the 800 m freestyle. Later she won two medals in the 200 m butterfly at the European and world championships.

References

1961 births
Living people
People from Zwickau
People from Bezirk Karl-Marx-Stadt
German female swimmers
Sportspeople from Saxony
German female freestyle swimmers
Female butterfly swimmers
Olympic swimmers of East Germany
Swimmers at the 1980 Summer Olympics
Olympic bronze medalists for East Germany
Olympic bronze medalists in swimming
World Aquatics Championships medalists in swimming
European Aquatics Championships medalists in swimming
Medalists at the 1980 Summer Olympics
20th-century German women